James Moss Stoney III (February 26, 1888July 19, 1965) was an Episcopal prelate who served as Bishop of New Mexico and Southwest Texas from 1942 to 1956.

Early life and education
Stoney was born on February 26, 1888, in Camden, South Carolina, to the Reverend James Moss Stoney Jr and Jeannie Johnson Shannon. He was the third generation to become a priest, after his father and grandfather. He was educated at public schools and then moved on to study at the University of Georgia between 1904 and 1905. He left to study at the University of the South from where he graduated with a Bachelor of Arts in 1911 and a Bachelor of Divinity in 1913. He married Mary Clifton Roberts on April 7, 1915, and together had three children. Mary died in 1924 and he then married Nora Louise Green on February 16, 1926.

Ordained ministry
Stoney was ordained deacon on June 23, 1913, and then priest on June 4, 1914, from the hands of Bishop William A. Guerry of South Carolina. He served as rector of Christ Church in Charleston, South Carolina, between 1913 and 1916, and then curate at St John's Church in Savannah, Georgia, from 1916 to 1917. Between 1917 and 1921 he served at Holy Trinity Church in Clemson, South Carolina, and St Paul's Church in Pendleton, South Carolina, with the exception of the period between 1918 and 1919 where he served as a chaplain of the American Expeditionary Forces. In 1921 he became rector of Grace Church in Anniston, Alabama, where he remain until 1942. Whilst at Grace Church he established three missions.

Episcopacy
In February 1942, the House of Bishops which met in Jacksonville, Florida, elected Stoney as Missionary Bishop of New Mexico and Southwest Texas. He was consecrated on April 16, 1942, in the Church of St Michael and All Angels, Anniston, Alabama, by Presiding Bishop Henry St. George Tucker. In 1952, the missionary district became a diocese and he became the first diocesan bishop of New Mexico and Southwest Texas. He retired in 1956 and died on July 19, 1965, in Albuquerque, New Mexico.

References

External links 
 

1888 births
1965 deaths
20th-century American Episcopalians
Episcopal bishops of the Rio Grande
Sewanee: The University of the South alumni